Loch Ness is a large freshwater loch (lake) in the Scottish Highlands.

Loch Ness may also refer to:

 Loch Ness (film)
 Loch Ness Monster ("Nessie")
 Loch Ness Monster in popular culture
 "Lochness" (song), a song by Judas Priest
 Loch Ness (wrestler), British professional wrestler Martin Ruane, who used the name in WCW in the mid-1990s as a member of the Dungeon of Doom stable
 Loch Ness, an alternative title to British television drama series The Loch

See also
Ness Lake
Thea Sofie Loch Næss